Drisht is a village, former bishopric and Latin titular see (Roman Catholic Diocese of Drivasto) with an Ancient and notable medieval history (Latin Drivastum, Italian Drivasto) in Albania, 6 km from Mes Bridge (Albanian: Ura e Mesit). It is located in the former municipality Postribë in the Shkodër County. At the 2015 local government reform it became part of the municipality Shkodër. The ruined 13th Century Drisht Castle is on a hilltop 300m above sea level. The ruins of the castle itself contains the remains of 11 houses, and below the ruins of the castle, and above the modern village of Drisht are further archeological remains of late-Roman and medieval Drivastum.

Name
The name of the settlement was recorded in Latin as Drivastum. Albanian Drisht derives from Drivastum through Albanian phonetic changes, however it has been noted that the accentual pattern found in Drísht < Drívastum presupposes an Adriatic "Illyrian" intermediary.

History 
The settlement of Drivastum is known to have existed before the tenth century AD. The Diocese of Drivastum became a suffragan of the Archdiocese of Antivari in 1089, after it was transferred from the Archdiocese of Ragusa.

In 1081—1116 Drivastum belonged to the kingdom of Duklja. In 1183, Serbian Stefan Nemanja conquered Drivast and its surroundings.

In 1241, the city was plundered by the Mongols under Subutai, as they were advancing east across Zeta, while heading home. Scholars estimate that Drivast was taken by the Balšići ca. spring of 1362. However, it is known that by 1363, they had captured Drivast and nearby Scutari.

In 1393, Đurađ II Balšić, having negotiated his freedom from Ottoman captivity, submitted to the Great Sultan's suzerainty and surrendered Drivast, Sveti Srđ and Scutari. However, Đurađ soon ended his vassalage to the Ottomans and reconquered the cities he had surrendered mere months before. In 1395, knowing he could not outlast an Ottoman attack, he handed these cities, including Drivast, to dogal Venice in exchange for 1,000 ducats yearly.

In 1399, the townspeople in Drivasto (the city's new Italian name) and Scutari started a revolt against Venice, angered at the high taxes they were paying. The revolt lasted for three years, when Venetian troops managed to control the situation. However, the areas surrounding Drivast and Scutari no longer recognized Venetian authority.

Angered by Venice's policy on his former lands and its trade monopoly policy that caused an economic stagnation in his ports, Đurađ II sent troops to his former lands, including Drivast, breaking his peace treaty with Venice. Đurađ's actions led to Venice believing that he had a major role in the uprising's initiation. Scholars are unsure whether this accusation is accurate. The Turks also decided to send raiding parties to these rebellious lands.

In 1423 Đurađ Branković conquered Drivast and annexed it to Serbian Despotate. Supported by Ottomans, Gojčin Crnojević and Little Tanush Dukagjin, Maramonte plundered region around Scutari and Ulcinj and attacked Drivast in 1429, but failed to capture it.

In August 1442, Venice took Drivast from Serbian Despot Đurađ Branković. Native citizens of Drivast were hostile toward advances of Albanians and Serbs so they accepted Venetian suzerainty only under condition that Venice wouldn't employ Albanian pronoiers and to return to the city land Serbian despot gave to Serbs.

In 1447, Skanderbeg demanded from the Venetians to give control over Drivast to him, along with the lands which earlier belonged to Lekë Zakarija. However, the Venetians refused to accept his demands and Skanderbeg started the war against Venice.

In March 1451 Lekë Dukagjini and Božidar Dushmani planned to attack Venetian controlled Drivast. Their plot was discovered and Božidar was forced to exile.

In September 1478, Drivast was captured by the Ottomans.

Ecclesiastical History 

The bishopric was founded around 400 AD, as a suffragan of its Late Roman province Dalmatia Superior's capital Doclea's Metropolitan bishop.
 
Drivastum became a suffragan of the Archdiocese of Antivari in 1089, after it was transferred from the Archdiocese of Ragusa.
The townspeople of Drivast murdered one of their bishops in the thirteenth century.

The residential see was suppressed in 1650, its territory being merged into the Diocese of Shkodrë (in Albania).

Titular see 
In 1933 the diocese was nominally restored as Latin Titular bishopric of Drivastum (Drivasto in Curiate Italian).

It has had the following incumbents, of the fitting episcopal (lowest) rank with two archiepiscopal (intermediary) exceptions :
 Cipriano Cassini (趙信義), Jesuits (S.J.) (1936.12.23 – 1946.04.11)
 Daniel Liston, Holy Ghost Fathers (C.S.Sp.) (1947.03.13 – 1949.12.19)
 João Floriano Loewenau, Friars Minor (O.F.M.) (1950.09.08 – 1979.06.04)
 Rafael Barraza Sánchez (1979.10.26 – 1981.10.19)
 Titular Archbishop Traian Crisan (1981.12.07 – 1990.11.06)
 Bruno Bertagna (1990.12.15 – 2007.02.15) (later Archbishop)
 Titular Archbishop Bruno Bertagna (2007.02.15 – 2013.10.31)
 Paul Tighe (2015.12.19 – ...), Adjunct Secretary of Pontifical Council for Culture, Member of Vatican Media Committee

Modern Drisht 
The population of modern Drisht is predominantly Muslim and Albanian speaking. Drisht is accessible by a 4x4 or by walking.

See also 
Statutes of Drivasto

References

Sources and external links

 

 GCatholic with incumbent bio links
 External links
 Photo of the ruined castle

Further reading 
 

Populated places in Shkodër
Villages in Shkodër County